Tatiana Viktorovna Kravtchenko (1936 or 13 June 1940 – 25 May 2016) was a rhythmic gymnast who competed for the Soviet Union. She was a two-time (1963, 1965) World all-around silver medalist and was a member of the Soviet group that won the first-ever World group title, held at the 1967 World Championships. She was an Honored Master of Sports in rhythmic gymnastics.

Career 
Tatiana Kravtchenko, a statuesque blonde, was one of the pioneers of rhythmic gymnastics in the 1960s. She competed at the first World Championships held in Budapest, winning the individual All-around silver medal. She won another silver medal in All-around at the 1965 World Championships.

Group exercises debuted on the World stage at the 1967 World Championships in Copenhagen. Kravtchenko and Ludmila Savinkova were among the six gymnasts in the Soviet team for Group Exercise and won the gold medal, marking the beginning of the Soviet rhythmic gymnastics school's international successes. Both Savinkova and Kravtchenko were coached by Tamara Lisitzian, and later on, by her sister Maria Lisitzian.

At the start of the 1960s, rhythmic gymnastics was still looking for the right direction of development and the execution artistry was considered by some to be rather important. Throughout her career, Kravtchenko remained faithful to the Soviet classical style and music. Her best known routine was the one without hand apparatus to "Russian theme" music. It brought her the world gold medal in Freehands on this piece at the 1965 World Championships in Prague.

Personal life 
Kravtchenko finished her education at the High Institute for Physical Culture in Moscow. She then earned a degree at the High Institute for Arts.

Kravtchenko died on 25 May 2016 in Moscow.

References

External links

1940 births
2016 deaths
Russian rhythmic gymnasts
Soviet rhythmic gymnasts
Gymnasts from Moscow
Medalists at the Rhythmic Gymnastics World Championships